Historia destructionis Troiae ("History of the destruction of Troy"), also called Historia Troiana, is a Latin prose narrative written by Guido delle Colonne, a Sicilian author, in the early 13th century. Its main source was the Old French verse romance by Benoît de Sainte-Maure, Roman de Troie. The author claims that the bulk of the work was written in 71 days, from September 15 to November 25 of an unspecified year, with the full text being completed some time in 1287. As a result of this hasty composition, the work is sloppy at points and prone toward anacoluthon.

In later centuries several translations of Guido's work appeared, in Catalan, Dutch, English, French, Polish, Czech, German and Italian:
 Històries troianes, translated to Catalan by Jaume Conesa, in 1367
 John Lydgate, Troy Book, written in English around 1412-1420
 The gest hystoriale of the destruction of Troy, in English alliterative meter
 Jacques Milet, La destruction de la Troye, in French, between 1450 and 1452 
 Historia (...) o zburzeniu a zniszczeniu onego sławnego a znamienitego miastha y państwa trojańskiego, in Polish, published at Kraków, 1563
 Historische, warhaffte und eigentliche Beschreibung von der alten Statt Troia, in German, published at Basle, 1599
 La storia della guerra di Troia, in Italian, published at Naples, 1665

Editions

References

13th-century Latin books
Trojan War literature